Greatest Hits is a greatest hits double album that was released on November 16, 2004 by Bone Thugs-N-Harmony. It features Bone's most popular songs between the years 1994 and 2002.

The album spent 47 weeks in the Top R&B/Hip-Hop Albums chart, peaking at No.30.

Track listing

Charts

Weekly charts

Year-end charts

Certifications

References

Bone Thugs-n-Harmony albums
2004 greatest hits albums
Ruthless Records compilation albums
Gangsta rap compilation albums